William Francis (W.F.) Ryan (born 1937) is a British librarian and scholar of Russian language and culture, who has been described as "one of the world's foremost experts" on Russian magic and witchcraft.

He is Emeritus Professor and Honorary Fellow, School of Advance Study, The Warburg Institute, University of London.

Career 
Between 1967 and 1976, Ryan was a lecturer in Russian Language and Literature at the School of Slavonic and East European Studies, University of London.  In 1976 he was appointed Academic Librarian at the Warburg Institute, University of London, a position he held until 2002.

In 1999, Ryan published The Bathhouse at Midnight: An Historical Survey of Magic and Divination in Russia (1999), which was described by one reviewer as "the most thorough and detailed study to date on the magic and divination of Russian and Eastern Slav peoples".

Recognition 
Ryan was elected as Fellow of the British Academy in 2000. In 2005 Ryan delivered the British Library's Panizzi Lectures, on ‘The Magic of Russia’, which were published in 2006.  Between 2005 and 2008 Ryan served as President of the Folklore Society.

Selected publications 

 Ryan, W. F; Schmitt, Charles B (eds) (1983). Pseudo-Aristotle the secret of secrets: sources and influences. London: The Warburg Institute. . OCLC 848737353.
 Schmitt, Charles Bernard; Ryan, W. F; Kraye, Jill (eds) (1986). Pseudo-Aristotle in the Middle Ages: the theology and other texts. London: Warburg Institute. . OCLC 884261018.
 Ryan, W. F; Norman, Peter (eds) (1995). The Penguin Russian dictionary. London: Penguin. . OCLC 477191306.
 Ryan, W. F (1999). The bathhouse at midnight: an historical survey of magic and divination in Russia. Stroud: Sutton. OCLC 767558870.
 Ryan, W. F (2006). The Panizzi lectures 2005: Russian magic at the British Library: books, manuscripts, scholars, travellers. London: British Library. . OCLC 506180806.
 Burnett, Charles; Ryan, W. F (eds) (2006). Magic and the classical tradition. London; Turin: The Warburg Institute ; Nino Aragno. . OCLC 804851957.
 Kapaló, J. A.; Pócs, Éva; Ryan, W.F. (eds) (2013). The power of words: studies on charms and charming in Europe. Budapest; New York: Central European University Press. . OCLC 903379636.
 Ryan, W. F; Taube, Moshe (eds) (2019). The Secret of Secrets: The East Slavic Version. Introduction, Text, Annotated Translation, and Slavic Index. London: The Warburg Institute. . OCLC 1182800516.

References 

1937 births
Living people
British librarians
Fellows of the British Academy
Presidents of the Folklore Society